Phosphatase and tensin homolog (mutated in multiple advanced cancers 1), pseudogene 1, also known as PTENP1, is a human pseudogene. which has a partial reactivated function as a competing endogenous RNA regulating  the tumor suppressor gene PTEN.

References

Further reading 

 
 
 
 
 
 
 
 

Pseudogenes